The Austro-Hungarian Empire's Luftfahrtruppen contained many pilots from many ethnic minorities. The following list of their World War I flying aces  contains those Austro-Hungarian aces identified as ethnic Croatian or born in the territory of modern-day Croatia:

 Miroslav Navratil, 10 verified victories.
 Raoul Stojsavljevic, 10 verified victories.
 Roman Schmidt, 6 verified victories.
 Johann Lasi, 5 verified victories.

See also
 List of World War I flying aces
 List of World War I flying aces from the Austro-Hungarian Empire
 List of World War I aces credited with 10 victories
 List of World War I aces credited with 6 victories
 List of World War I aces credited with 5 victories

References
Notes

Bibliography
 

Croatia
Lists of Croatian military personnel